Scythropiodes barbellatus is a moth in the family Lecithoceridae. It was described by Kyu-Tek Park and Chun-Sheng Wu in 1997. It is found in the provinces of Jiangxi, Fujian and Anhui in China.

The wingspan is 13–15 mm. The forewings are evenly brown to dark brown, but yellowish white along the costal margin. The hindwings are grey.

Etymology
The species name refers to the apical part of the valva and is derived from Latin barbellate (meaning having spines).

References

Moths described in 1997
Scythropiodes